Ignacio Ramonet Miguez (born 5 May 1943) is a Spanish academic, journalist and writer who has been based in Paris for much of his career. After becoming first known for writing on film and media, he became editor-in-chief of Le Monde diplomatique, serving from 1991 until March 2008. Under his leadership, LMD established editorial independence in 1996 from Le Monde, with which it had been affiliated since 1954.

Ramonet published an editorial in December 1997 in LMD on the Tobin tax that led to the launching of ATTAC. This is an activist organization promoting taxation of foreign exchange transactions.

In addition, Ramonet is one of the founders and president of the NGO Media Watch Global. He frequently contributes to El País, among other media, and participates in an advisory council to TeleSUR.

Life
Ramonet was born in Redondela (Pontevedra), Spain, in 1943. He went to Tangier, Morocco, to study engineering. He continued these studies at Bordeaux, Rabat and Paris. In Paris he earned a PhD in Semiology and the History of Culture, at Ecole des Hautes Etudes en Sciences Sociales (School for Advanced Studies in the Social Sciences)- EHESS, one of the French Grande Écoles.

He has been a professor of Communication Theory at Paris Diderot University. He also taught at the Sorbonne. He first started writing journalism as a film critic and writer about film for various magazines. Ramonet later wrote more frequently about media culture, communications, and national affairs, becoming associated with Le Monde Diplomatique, started in 1954 as a monthly publication associated with the newspaper.

He was elected as editor-in-chief in January 1991, serving to March 2008. Under his leadership, the magazine became editorially independent of Le Monde in 1996. It has been an independent critic outside academia of media culture and its ties to national society.

In 2007 Ramonet participated in the Stock Exchange of Visions project.

Opinions

Socialism
Ramonet says that it is a betrayal of socialism for some social democrat parties to have chosen the third way between socialism and capitalism.

Fidel Castro
The NGO Reporters without Borders had written about Ramonet's strong relationship with Fidel Castro. Ramonet denied this claim in 2002. In May 2004,  Ramonet supported Castro in a direct television interview when Castro protested about Forbes Magazine's list of country leaders' wealth. Castro was number 7 on the list.

In 2006, Ramonet praised Castro in a series of articles in Foreign Policy journal. He was approved as Castro's only authorised biographer. In September 2006, Ramonet published Fidel Castro : Biografía a Dos Voces.

Against globalization and neoliberalism
Ramonet has called for autarky and for regulation, taxes and tariffs that reduce international trade.

ATTAC
According to Ramonet, globalization and ultra-liberalism threaten the sovereignty of national states. In his December 1997 editorial "Disarming the markets", Ramonet attributed the Asian economic crisis to globalization, and said that it threatened the identity of national states. To counter this, he called for an NGO to promote the Tobin tax on foreign exchange. He became a founder of Association for the Taxation of Financial Transactions and for Citizens' Action (ATTAC).

Works
 1981 : Le Chewing-gum des yeux (French: Chewing Gum for the Eyes)
 1989 : La Communication victime des marchands
 1995 : Cómo nos venden la moto, with Noam Chomsky
 1996 : Nouveaux pouvoirs, nouveaux maîtres du monde (French: New Powers, New World Masters)
 1997 : Géopolitique du chaos (French: Geopolitics of Chaos)
 1998 : Internet, el mundo que llega (Spanish: Internet, the Coming World)
 1998 : Rebeldes, dioses y excluidos (Spanish: Rebels, Gods, and the Excluded), with Mariano Aguirre
 1999 : La Tyrannie de la communication (French: The Tyranny of Communication)
 1999 : Geopolítica y comunicación de final de milenio (Spanish: Geopolitics and Communication at the End of the Millennium)
 2000 : La golosina visual
 2000 : Propagandes silencieuses
 2001 : Marcos, la dignité rebelle
 2002 : La Post-Télévision
 2002 : Guerres du XXIe siècle (Wars of the 21st Century)
 2004 : Abécédaire partiel et partial de la mondialisation, with Ramón Chao and Wozniak
 2006: Fidel Castro: biografía a dos voces (Spanish: Fidel Castro: Biography with Two Voices) also titled Cien horas con Fidel (One Hundred Hours with Fidel)
2007: Fidel Castro: My Life, edited by Ignacio Ramonet, translated by Andrew Hurley, Allen Lane.
 2018, Cinco entrevistas a Noam Chomsky (Le Monde Diplomatique / Editorial Aun Creemos en los Sueños) by Michel Foucault, Ignacio Ramonet, Daniel Mermet, Jorge Majfud y Federico Kukso.

Articles
 [https://mondediplo.com/2003/10/01media Set The Media Free by Ignacio Ramonet] (2003)

See also
 ATTAC
 Financial transaction tax
 Tobin tax

References

External links

 Visions of Ignacio Ramonet (Video Interviews), Stock Exchange Of Visions
 

1943 births
Living people
People from Redondela
Spanish essayists
Spanish male writers
Spanish journalists
Writers from Galicia (Spain)
Mass media theorists
Anti-globalization writers
Male essayists